Angoche Island is a  small continental island in the district of same name, Mozambique. Being a coastal island its main source of income was the illegal shipment of slaves, which allowed for the enrichment of the aristocratic classes of the Nyapakho clan.  It was not taken by the Portuguese until 1913, thanks to the brave resistance of the sultan, particularly Ibrahim Iussuf. His nephew, who was the commander-in-chief of a 30.000 men army took over power and opposed with tenacity the Portuguese until 1890. By then, Farlah, the last sultan resumed the war against the Portuguese until he was captured in a battle in 1910 and deported to East Timor where he died in prison.  The small island is subject to cyclones; Cyclone Huda in particular is remembered, and so permanent habitation has not been possible. Angoche is the largest producer of cashew and shrimps in Mozambique.

Islands of Mozambique
Angoche District
Geography of Nampula Province